Ubuntu is an OpenType-based font family, designed to be a modern, humanist-style typeface by London-based type foundry Dalton Maag, with funding by Canonical Ltd. The font was under development for nearly nine months, with only a limited initial release through a beta program, until September 2010. It was then that it became the new default font of the Ubuntu operating system in Ubuntu 10.10. Its designers include Vincent Connare, creator of the Comic Sans and Trebuchet MS fonts.

The Ubuntu font family is licensed under the Ubuntu Font Licence.

History and features 

The font was first introduced in October 2010 with the release of Ubuntu 10.10 in four versions Regular, Italic, Bold, Bold Italic in English. With the release of Ubuntu 11.04 in April 2011, additional fonts and expanded language coverage were introduced. The final development is intended to include a total of thirteen fonts consisting of:
 Ubuntu in Regular, Italic, Bold and Bold Italic
 Ubuntu Monospace in Regular, Italic, Bold and Bold Italic
 Ubuntu Light in Regular, Italic
 Ubuntu Medium in Regular, Italic
 Ubuntu Condensed in Regular only

The monospace version, used in terminals, was initially planned to ship with Ubuntu 11.04. However, it was delayed and instead shipped with Ubuntu 11.10 as the default system monospace font.

The font is fully Unicode compliant and contains Latin A and B extended character sets, Greek polytonic, and Cyrillic extended. In addition, it has become the first native operating system font to include the Indian rupee sign. The font has been designed primarily for use on screen displays, and its spacing and kerning is optimised for body copy sizes.

Usage 

The Ubuntu Font Family is the default font for the current and development releases of the Ubuntu operating system and is used for the Ubuntu project branding.

The Ubuntu Font Family has been included in the Google Fonts directory, making it easily available for web typography, and as of April 26, 2011 it is included for use in Google Docs.

Ubuntu Monospace was prominently used in the 2014 video game Transistor.

Ubuntu bold-italic is also used in the bitcoin logotype, alongside the bitcoin symbol.

Ubuntu Font Licence 

The Ubuntu Font Licence is an "interim" license designed for the Ubuntu Font Family, which has used the license since version 0.68. The license is based on the SIL Open Font License.

The Ubuntu Font Licence allows the fonts to be "used, studied, modified and redistributed freely" given that the license terms are met. The license is copyleft and all derivative works must be distributed under the same license. Documents that use the fonts are not required to be licensed under the Ubuntu Font Licence.

Fedora and Debian have reviewed this license and converged on interpreting it as non-free due to incomplete or ambiguous use and modification permissions.

See also 

 FF Dax, a similar spurless sans-serif font
 Ubuntu Titling font
 Open-source Unicode typefaces
 GPL font exception
 SIL Open Font License

References

External links 

 Ubuntu Font Family main page
 Ubuntu Font Family on the Ubuntu Wiki

Humanist sans-serif typefaces
Unicode typefaces
Corporate typefaces
Open-source typefaces
Ubuntu
Typefaces and fonts introduced in 2010
Dalton Maag typefaces